Rugi may refer to:

 Rugii, an ancient Germanic tribe
 Rugi, Caraş-Severin, a village in Păltiniș Commune, Caraş-Severin County
 Rugi, Gorj, a village in Turcinești Commune, Gorj County
 Rugi, Bagalkot, a village in Karnataka, India